Mir Haji Muhammad Hayat Khan Talpur (13 April 1937 – 7 September 2020) was a Pakistani politician who had been a Member of the Provincial Assembly of Sindh, from May 2013 to May 2018.

Early life and education

He was born on 13 April 1937 in Digri.

He had a Bachelor of Arts degree from University of Sindh.

Political career

He was elected to the Provincial Assembly of Sindh as a candidate of Pakistan Peoples Party from Constituency PS-66 MIRPUR KHAS-III in 2013 Pakistani general election.

References

2020 deaths
Sindh MPAs 2013–2018
1937 births
University of Sindh alumni
People from Mirpur Khas District
Pakistan People's Party politicians